Samuel Jones  (born 1870) was a Welsh international footballer. He was part of the Wales national football team between 1893 and 1899, playing 6 matches. He played his first match on 18 March 1893 against Scotland and his last match on 20 March 1899 against England. At club level, he played for Wrexham and Druids.

See also
 List of Wales international footballers (alphabetical)

References

1870 births
Place of birth missing

Date of death missing

Year of death missing
Welsh footballers

Wales international footballers
Wrexham A.F.C. players
Druids F.C. players
Association footballers not categorized by position